The 2016 Malian Première Division was the 51st edition of the highest club level football competition in Mali. It started on 12 March and concluded on 2 October 2016.

First round

Poule A

 AS Avenir (Tombouctou) were excluded

Poule B

Final round

References

Mali
Malian Première Division seasons
football